American rapper Lil Uzi Vert has released two studio albums, four extended plays (EPs), five mixtapes and fifty-four singles (including thirty two as a featured artist).

In 2014, Uzi released two self-released projects titled Purple Thoughts EP Vol. 1  and The Real Uzi. After signing to Atlantic Records, Lil Uzi Vert released the mixtape Luv Is Rage. The following year, Uzi Vert released two mixtapes – Lil Uzi Vert vs. the World and The Perfect LUV Tape. The former mixtape spawned the single "Money Longer", which peaked at number 54 on the US Billboard Hot 100, as well as "You Was Right", which peaked at number 40. In 2016, Lil Uzi Vert released a collaborative extended play with rapper Gucci Mane, titled 1017 vs. The World.

Lil Uzi Vert's debut studio album, Luv Is Rage 2, was released on August 25, 2017, and charted at number one on the Billboard 200. It included the single "XO Tour Llif3", which peaked at number seven on the Billboard Hot 100 and has been Certified Diamond, by the RIAA. On July 24, 2017, Uzi Vert released 2 Luv Is 2 Rage on their SoundCloud page.

Their second studio album, Eternal Atake, was released on March 6, 2020, and spawned two singles: "Futsal Shuffle 2020", and "That Way". As of April 2019, they have sold more than 43 million records in the United States.

Albums

Studio albums

Collaborative albums

Deluxe albums

Mixtapes

EPs

Singles

As lead artist

As featured artist

Other charted songs

Guest appearances

Music videos

Notes

References

Discography
Discographies of American artists
Hip hop discographies